Ivan Filipović may refer to:

 Ivan Filipović (teacher), Croatian educator, writer and activist
 Ivan Filipović Grčić, Croatian priest and soldier
 Ivan Filipović (footballer), Croatian football player